Bhāskara is an epithet of the Hindu deity of the sun, Surya. It may also refer to:

People
 Bhāskara (Bhedabheda Vedanta), Indian philosopher who was an early figure in the Bhedabheda tradition of Vedanta
 Rao Siddani Bhaskara (born 1943), Indian graph theorist
 Bhāskara I (c. 600 – c. 680), Indian mathematician and commentator
 Bhāskara II (1114–1185), Indian mathematician and astronomer; wrote the Siddhanta Siromani
 Bhaskara (Kashmiri), writer; wrote on the Kashmir Shaivism sect of Hinduism
 Bhaskararaya (1690–1785), Indian writer; wrote on the worship of the Mother Goddess in Hinduism
 Bhaskara Sethupathy (1868–1905), Raja of Ramnad

Other uses
 Bhaskara Satellite series, satellites built by the Indian Space Research Organisation